The R27 was a New York City Subway car model built by the St. Louis Car Company from 1960 to 1961 for the IND/BMT B Division. A total of 230 cars were built, arranged in married pairs. Two versions were manufactured: Westinghouse (WH)-powered cars and General Electric (GE)-powered cars.

The first R27s entered service on November 15, 1960. In early 1989, twenty-seven R27s were rebuilt and painted in the fox red paint scheme that also appeared on the R30s, with the intention to operate these cars for several more years. The unrebuilt R27s were replaced by the R68As, with the last unrebuilt train running on May 12, 1989. Almost all overhauled R27s were retired the same year due to reliability problems and the lack of air conditioning on the cars. The R27 cars were retired in the early 1990s; none of the R27 fleet were preserved, since they were identical to the later R30/R30A fleet.

Description
The R27s were numbered 8020–8249.

The R27s were a continuation of the R16 style, except that the cars used the IRT R26-style pink hard fiberglass all-longitudinal seating instead of the mixed combination seating found on the older R16s, as well as removing the "porthole" style front windows found on the R15, R16, and R17.

The R27s were coupled together as pairs. These cars, along with their identical R30 and R30A sister cars, replaced the oldest BMT Standards (including all 50 of the trailer cars), the ME-1s purchased and transferred from the SIRT, the MS Multi-section cars, and the IRT Lo-Vs that were modified to be used on B-division shuttles. The R27s were the first cars not to use the numerical route designations used on former BMT lines; the cars ushered in letter designations for such routes (continuing where the IND designations ended). After the merger in late 1967, many IND and BMT routes were joined together by some lines.

There were two versions of the R27: Westinghouse (WH)-powered equipped cars (8020–8135) and General Electric (GE)-powered cars (8136–8249).

History
The first train of R27s, consisting of cars 8027–8024, 8021–8020, and 8028–8029, were placed into or entered service on the  route on November 15, 1960. The R27s were initially assigned to the QT and  routes. Once the R27s arrived in sufficient numbers, they provided most weekend service on the BMT Southern Division.

Many R27s were transferred to the BMT Eastern Division after November 1967, although they would appear in the northern and southern divisions as well as on many IND routes as well.

Overhaul
In early 1989, 24 selected GE-powered R27s and 3 WH-powered R27s were rebuilt and painted in the fox red paint scheme, similar to the 162 GE-powered R30s and other Redbird trains in the subway system, as part of the Clean Car Program. The overhaul of the 27 cars cost $100,000 per car.

Only one R27, 8027, continued service after the overhauled cars were retired. It was paired with a WH-powered R30 car, painted red just like the R30 fleet, and continued service into 1990.

Retirement
The R27s were replaced by the R68As in 1989 and 1990 (they were indirectly replaced by rebuilt R38s and unrebuilt R30s, which started appearing on the C in late 1988). The last un-rebuilt R27 train ran on May 12, 1989, which marked an end to graffiti on subway cars since 1969.

When removed from service in 1989–90, the cars were sent to what is now Sims Metal Management's Newark facility to be scrapped and processed. Some cars were retained as movie props, but were ultimately scrapped as well. The last R27 in existence was car 8145, which was retained as a school car until 2011. Initially held for the New York Transit Museum, it was stored at the Pitkin Yard, but towed to the 207th Street Yard in summer 2013, and finally sent to Sims Metal Management in Newark, New Jersey to be scrapped on October 22, 2013. No other known examples of the R27 survive.

See also
R30/R30A - a very similar model also built by St. Louis Car Company.

References

Further reading
 Sansone, Gene. Evolution of New York City subways: An illustrated history of New York City's transit cars, 1867-1997. New York Transit Museum Press, New York, 1997

External links
NYC Subway Cars: R27
They Moved Millions

Train-related introductions in 1960
R027
St. Louis multiple units
1960 in rail transport
Scrapped locomotives